Anne Kajir (born c. 1974) is an attorney from Papua New Guinea. She has uncovered evidence of widespread corruption in the Papua New Guinea government, that allowed illegal logging in tropical forests. Kajir was awarded the Goldman Environmental Prize in 2006.

References

Papua New Guinean lawyers
Year of birth missing (living people)
Living people
Papua New Guinean environmentalists
Papua New Guinean women environmentalists
Goldman Environmental Prize awardees